State Supplies of the USSR, known as the Gossnab of USSR was active from 1948 to 1953, and 1965 to 1991. It was the state committee for material technical supply in the Soviet Union. It was charged with the primary responsibility for the allocation of producer goods to enterprises, a critical state function in the absence of markets.

Gossnab was one of more than twenty state committees under the Council of Ministers, the administrative arm of the Soviet government, along with other economic organs such as Gosplan (the state planning committee) and Gosbank (the state bank). Created amid a series of economic reforms implemented under Premier Alexei Kosygin in the mid-1960s, Gossnab coordinated the allocation of resources not handled by Gosplan. Gossnab had mixed success in creating a wholesale trade system, based on direct contracts between suppliers and users.

Narkomprod
Originally founded in 1917 as the People's Commissariat for Food Supplies (translit. Narodny Commissariat Prodovolstviya, often abbreviated as Narkomprod) was the People's Commissariat (ministry) of the Russian SFSR in charge of food supplies and industrial goods. The first Commissar was Ivan Teodorovich.

There were several subsidiary organisations:
 1918 - 1919  - Central Procurement Bureau (Tsentrozakup)
 1917 - 1918  - Special Commissioner for the Supply of Food for Workers in Enterprises Preparing Fuel for the Country (Khleboles)
 1918 - 1920  - General Directorate of the Distribution Products (Glavproduct)
 1918 - 1920  - Extraordinary Regional Committee for Food and Supply of the South of Russia (Chokprod)
 1918 - 1919  - United bureaus of Russian food and cooperative organizations for food
 1919 - 1922  - Central Commission for the Supply of Workers (Tsekorabsnab)

The Narkomprod was responsible in June 1918 for the attempted organisation of 'committees of the poor' in provincial villages. This was an attempt to encourage a 'class war' in the countryside but it did not materialise, mainly because the peasants were not resentful of 'kulaks' (rich peasants) as there was a tendency for all peasants to have the same interests (for example, their own land ownership).

Commissars
 Ivan Teodorovich (1875-1937) (Russian Иван Адольфович Теодорович), 1917-1917
 Alexander Schlichter (1868-1940) (Russian Александр Григорьевич Шлихтер), 1917-1918
 Alexander Zjurupa (1870-1928) (Russian Александр Дмитриевич Цюрупа), 1918-1921
 Nikolai Bryukhanov (1878-1938) (Russian Николай Павлович Брюханов), 1921-1923
 Moisei Kalmanovich (1888-1937) (Russian Моисей Иосифович Калманович), 1923-1924

Reformation as Gossnab
The Commissariat was reformed as a state committee in 1948. It performed the  functions of: implementation of plans for material and technical supply, distribution of products to consumers according to the established nomenclature, ensuring inter-industry cooperative supplies, monitoring the timeliness of implementation of product delivery plans  .

The Gossnab coordinated with the USSR State Planning Committee (Gosplan), the Ministry of Finance of the USSR and the sectoral ministries and departments of the USSR and the Union republics.

Chairmen of the Gossnab 

 1947 - 1952  -  Lazar Moiseevich Kaganovich
 1952 - 1953  -  Ivan Grigorievich Kabanov
 1965 - 1976  - Veniamin Emmanuilovich Dymshits
 1976 - 1985 - Nikolai Vasilievich Martynov
 1985 - 1989  - Lev Alekseevich Voronin
 1989 - 1991  - Pavel Ivanovich Mostovoy

See also
Alexander Tsiuryupa
Gosplan
Soviet-type economic planning

References

State Committees of the Soviet Union
Economy of the Soviet Union
Economic planning
1948 establishments in the Soviet Union
1965 establishments in the Soviet Union